Robert Banks Stewart (16 July 1931 – 14 January 2016) was a Scottish screenwriter, television producer and former journalist. He was sometimes credited as Robert Stewart early in his career. Banks Stewart contributed extensively to drama for the BBC and ITV for several decades, which included creating and producing the series Shoestring (1979) and Bergerac (1981) and producing the first series of Lovejoy (1986). He also produced and co-adapted the early episodes of The Darling Buds of May (1991).

Career 
Born in Edinburgh, Banks Stewart did national service in the British Army and began writing as a journalist, working for his home city's evening newspapers, where he became the youngest news editor in history for the Evening Dispatch. Even then, he used to discuss ideas for television series. Later he became a story editor at Pinewood Studios. Working as a scriptwriter from the end of the 1950s, he worked on such TV series as Danger Man, The Human Jungle, Top Secret and The Avengers ("The Master Minds" and "Quick-Quick Slow Death"). He also contributed a few scripts to the Edgar Wallace Mysteries series of second features for the cinema.

Working for Thames Television he contributed scripts to the programmes Callan, Special Branch, The Sweeney and Owner Occupied. For HTV, he wrote five episodes of Arthur of the Britons. Banks Stewart wrote two popular serials for the BBC science-fiction series Doctor Who when it starred Tom Baker: Terror of the Zygons (1975) (which was set in his native Scotland and drew on the Loch Ness Monster legend) and The Seeds of Doom (1976) (which was influenced by classic science-fiction such as The Day of the Triffids, The Quatermass Experiment and The Thing from Another World). A third story,  The Foe from the Future, was considered but ultimately cancelled as Stewart became unavailable, but Robert Holmes wrote The Talons of Weng Chiang (1977) from the idea by Robert Banks Stewart, who received no on-screen credit. An audio adaptation of The Foe from the Future was released in 2012 by Big Finish Productions.

Banks Stewart continued working in television as a writer, script editor and producer, creating Shoestring (1979–80), which ran for two series on the BBC and following this up with the Jersey-set detective drama series Bergerac (1981–91). He later produced Hannay (5 episodes, 1988), The Darling Buds of May (4 episodes), Lovejoy (10 episodes) and Call Me Mister. His final credit for television was for the adaptation of My Uncle Silas (2001–03) starring Albert Finney.

At the age of 81, Banks Stewart published his first novel—a thriller entitled The Hurricane's Tail, featuring a British detective called Detective Sergeant Harper Buchanan who uncovers a political plot against the prime minister of a Caribbean island. It was originally envisaged as a two-part TV series, but Banks Stewart said he decided to turn it into a novel after "getting nowhere" with TV executives, which he attributed to ageism. His memoir of working in the television industry, To Put You in the Picture, was published in 2015.

Personal life 
He had three sons, Alex Hanson Stewart, Andy Stewart and Angus Stewart.

Death 
On 14 January 2016, Robert Banks Stewart died of cancer at the age of 84.

References

External links
 

1931 births
2016 deaths
20th-century British Army personnel
20th-century British screenwriters
BBC television producers
British male television writers
Deaths from cancer in the United Kingdom
Scottish journalists
Scottish science fiction writers
Scottish television producers
Scottish television writers
Writers from Edinburgh